Arbet is a surname. Notable people with the surname include:

Darren Arbet (born 1962), American football coach
Gregor Arbet (born 1983), Estonian basketball player and coach
Kevin Arbet (born 1981), American football player, nephew of Darren

See also
Arbet Kozhaya, a city in Lebanon